Carol Hemming is a make-up artist who was nominated in the category of Best Makeup at the 67th Academy Awards. She was nominated for Mary Shelley's Frankenstein, she shared her nomination with Paul Engelen and Daniel Parker.

Selected filmography

 The Bostonians (1984)
 The Remains of the Day (1993)
 Mary Shelley's Frankenstein (1994)
 A Midsummer Night's Dream (1999)
 Hairspray (2007)
 Stardust (2007)
 Dark Shadows (2012)
 The Lone Ranger (2013)
 Jack Ryan: Shadow Recruit (2014)
 Cinderella (2015)

References

External links

Make-up artists
Living people
Year of birth missing (living people)